The women's 200 metres event at the 2015 Summer Universiade was held on 9 and 10 July at the Gwangju Universiade Main Stadium.

Medalists

Results

Heats
Qualification: First 3 in each heat (Q) and next 6 fastest (q) qualified for the semifinals.

Wind:Heat 1: -2.4 m/s, Heat 2: -1.8 m/s, Heat 3: -0.8 m/s, Heat 4: -2.2 m/s, Heat 5: -0.1 m/s, Heat 6: -0.8 m/s

Semifinals
Qualification: First 2 in each heat (Q) and the next 2 fastest (q) qualified for the final.

Wind:Heat 1: -1.3 m/s, Heat 2: -0.3 m/s, Heat 3: -0.7 m/s

Final
Wind: -0.8 m/s

References

200
2015 in women's athletics
2015